Rari Nantes Imperia is an Italian water polo club from Imperia founded in 1957. It is best known for its women's team, which in 2012 won the LEN Trophy and was the national championship's runner-up.

Titles
 Women
 LEN Trophy (1)
 2012

2012–13 squads
 Men
 P — Vittorio Foroni, Eugenio Emmolo
 D — Edoardo Grossi, Filippo Rocchi, Andi Shapka
 CV — Andrea Amelio, Marco Capanna, Marco Giordano, Nicola Parodi, Riccardo Parodi
 A — Matteo Emmolo, Daniele Ferrari, Giovani Merano, Giacomo Rocchi, Andrea Somà, Giacomo Strafforello, Simone Valente
 CB — Filippo Corio, Stefano Frattoni, Andrea Poracchia
 Women 
 P — Valeria Costamagna, Giulia Gorlero, Cecilia Solaini
 D — Elena Borriello, Laura Drocco, Francesca Pometi, Elena Russo
 CV — Martina Bencardino, Mercédesz Stieber
 A — Carla Carrega, Elisa Casanova, Giulia Emmolo, Gloria Gorlero, Maria Raissa Risivi, Anaid Ralat

References

Water polo clubs in Liguria
Water polo clubs in Italy
Province of Imperia
Sport in Liguria
Sports clubs established in 1957